Andrew William Schabner (29 October 1786 – 25 October 1838) was an English first-class cricketer who made 15 known appearances from 1811 to 1824. He was mainly associated with Marylebone Cricket Club (MCC) but also played for Surrey, Middlesex and Hampshire.

References

1786 births
1838 deaths
English cricketers
English cricketers of 1787 to 1825
Marylebone Cricket Club cricketers
Surrey cricketers
Hampshire cricketers
Middlesex cricketers
Epsom cricketers
Gentlemen of England cricketers
E. H. Budd's XI cricketers
St John's Wood cricketers
William Ward's XI cricketers
George Osbaldeston's XI cricketers